Max Mirnyi and Daniel Nestor were the two-time defending champions but decided not to participate together.  Mirnyi played with Horia Tecău, but the team lost in the first round to James Blake and Jack Sock.   Nestor partnered up with Łukasz Kubot, but the team lost in the semifinals to Blake and Sock.

Seeds

Draw

Draw

References
 Main Draw

U.S. National Indoor Tennis Championships - Doubles
2013 Men's Doubles